The Clarkston Tithing Granary, at 10212 N. 8700 West in Clarkston, Utah was built in 1905 to house inkind tithing donations by the Church of Jesus Christ of Latter-day Saints.  It was listed on the National Register of Historic Places in 1985.

The building was moved a few blocks in 2018 from its original location on E 100 S (behind house at northeast corner of E 100 S and S 100 E) to new location at 88 W. Center St. (southeast corner of W. Center St. and S 100 W).

The building was moved on September 8, 2018.

It is a one-story frame building with a gable roof, and with a shed roof porch.

Notes

References

Tithing buildings of the Church of Jesus Christ of Latter-day Saints
National Register of Historic Places in Cache County, Utah
Buildings and structures completed in 1905
1905 establishments in Utah
Relocated buildings and structures in Utah
Granaries